The blue dacnis or turquoise honeycreeper (Dacnis cayana) is a small passerine bird. This member of the tanager family is found from Nicaragua to  Panama, on Trinidad, and in South America south to Bolivia and northern Argentina. It is widespread and often common, especially in parts of its South American range.

Taxonomy
In 1760 the French zoologist Mathurin Jacques Brisson included a description of the blue dacnis in his Ornithologie based on a specimen collected in Cayenne in French Guiana. He used the French name Le Pepit bleu de Cayenne and the Latin name Sylvia cayanensis caerulea. Although Brisson coined Latin names, these do not conform to the binomial system and are not recognised by the International Commission on Zoological Nomenclature. When in 1766 the Swedish naturalist Carl Linnaeus updated his Systema Naturae for the twelfth edition he added 240 species that had been previously described by Brisson. One of these was the blue dacnis. Linnaeus included a terse description, coined the binomial name Motacilla cayana and cited Brisson's work. The specific name cayana is from Cayenne. This species is now placed in the genus Dacnis that was introduced in 1816 by the French naturalist Georges Cuvier with the blue dacnis as the type species.

Eight subspecies are recognised:.        e
 D. c. callaina Bangs, 1905 – west Costa Rica to southwest Panama
 D. c. ultramarina Lawrence, 1864 – Honduras to northwest Colombia
 D. c. napaea Bangs, 1898 – north, north-central Colombia
 D. c. baudoana Meyer de Schauensee, 1946 – southwest Colombia and west Ecuador
 D. c. caerebicolor Sclater, PL, 1851 – central Colombia
 D. c. cayana (Linnaeus, 1766) – east Colombia to French Guiana, Trinidad and north, central Brazil
 D. c. glaucogularis Berlepsch & Stolzmann, 1896 – south Colombia through east Ecuador and east Peru to north, east Bolivia
 D. c. paraguayensis Chubb, C, 1910 – east, south Brazil, east Paraguay and northeast Argentina

The purplish honeycreeper (Chlorophanes purpurascens), a bird from Venezuela known only from the type specimen, is considered to be an intergeneric hybrid between the green honeycreeper and either the red-legged honeycreeper or the blue dacnis.

Description
The blue dacnis is 12.7 cm long and weighs 13 g. Despite its alternative name, it is not a honeycreeper, which are longer-billed. The adult male is turquoise blue with a black around the eyes, and on the throat and back. The wings and tail are black, edged with turquoise. The female and immature are mainly green with a blue head, paler green underparts and green-edged brown wings. The blue dacnis's call is a thin tsip.

Distribution and habitat
The blue dacnis occurs in forests and other woodlands, including gardens and parks.

Behaviour and ecology
The bulky cup nest is built in a tree and the normal clutch is of two to three grey-blotched whitish eggs. The female incubates the eggs, but is fed by the male.

These are social birds which eat mainly insects gleaned from foliage, flowers or bromeliads. Fruit (such as licorice, Cecropia, Clusia, Miconia, berries, figs and bananas) is often taken and usually swallowed whole, but nectar is rarely consumed.

References

Further reading

External links

Blue Dacnis videos on the Internet Bird Collection
Blue Dacnis photo gallery VIREO
Photo-High Res; Article geometer—"Birds of Brazil"
Article, and Write-up:Male and Female Photos fireflyforest.net—"Blue Dacnis"

blue dacnis
Birds of Nicaragua
Birds of Costa Rica
Birds of Panama
Birds of the Amazon Basin
Birds of Brazil
Birds of Colombia
Birds of Venezuela
Birds of Ecuador
Birds of the Guianas
Birds of Trinidad and Tobago
blue dacnis
blue dacnis